Hong Pheng (born 1 November 1989) is a former Cambodian footballer who last played as a center back for Boeung Ket in the Cambodian League and also Cambodia national football team. He served as a team captain.

Career
Hong Pheng started his career with Baksey Chamkrong, and after a couple impressive seasons joined 
Phnom Penh Crown in 2011. However, he had limited playing opportunities at the club, and three years later joined rivals Boeung Ket Angkor. Hong Pheng made his international debut against Malaysia on 20 September 2014.

International career
Hong Pheng represented Cambodia at international level and scored his first goal for his country on 7 June 2016 in a 2019 AFC Asian Cup qualification match against Chinese Taipei.

International goals
As of match played 7 June 2016. Cambodia score listed first, score column indicates score after each Pheng goal.

Honours

Club
Phnom Penh Crown
Cambodian League: 2011, 2014
 2011 AFC President's Cup: Runner up
 2014 Mekong Club Championship: Third Place
Boeung Ket 
 Cambodian League: 2016, 2017, 2020
 2015 Mekong Club Championship: Runner up
 Hun Sen Cup: 2019

References

1989 births
Living people
Cambodian footballers
Cambodia international footballers
People from Battambang province
Phnom Penh Crown FC players
Boeung Ket Rubber Field players
Association football defenders